Kunal Ghosh (Kunal Kumar Ghosh [Bengali: কুণাল কুমার ঘোষ]; born 20 June 1968) is an Indian journalist and politician. He is a member of the All India Trinamool Congress (TMC) and a former member of the Parliament of India, representing West Bengal in the Rajya Sabha.

Journalism and political career 
Ghosh worked for Channel 10, as well as several newspapers. Ghosh holds the position of "message editor" of Prabaha, the first private news magazine in Bengal. His first byline story was in Patrika of the Anandabazar newspaper group. He then worked on multiple papers, including Aajkaal's Khela Patrika. His work at channel 10 included the show "Ek Phone e Ek Lakh".

A first information report was filed against Ghosh at the Bhowanipore police station by employees of the closed Bengali daily newspaper Sakalbela for non-payment of salaries, and another at the Park Street police station by employees of Channel 10 for a similar reason. He was later interrogated by the police on these charges.

In 2013, Ghosh was accused in the Saradha chit fund scam. He was arrested by the Mamata Banerjee-constituted special investigation team (SIT) on 24 November 2013. Less than two months later, the TMC suspended him for six years for publicly criticising the party. Following this action, Ghosh repeatedly dragged the TMC chief's name into the Saradha Group financial scandal, one of the biggest political scandals in West Bengal. He had urged the Central Bureau of Investigation (CBI) to interrogate Banerjee in connection with the scam and called her the ‘biggest beneficiary’ of the Saradha group's media operations.

Ghosh has reportedly returned 2.67 crores inr that he earned from Saradha Group as salary and for advertisements paid to him by Saradha Group while he worked for the media company.

Other positions held in Parliament 
 July 2020: Appointed State spokesperson of Trinamool Congress.
 June 2021: Appointed as the State General Secretary of Trinamool Congress.

Honors 
In 2019, Ghosh inaugurated the "Mamata Setu"(Bridge) in Cooch Behar with the help of his MP-LAD fund.

References

Living people
1968 births
West Bengal politicians
Trinamool Congress politicians from West Bengal
Rajya Sabha members from West Bengal
Indian prisoners and detainees
Crime in West Bengal
Corruption in West Bengal
People charged with corruption